Cecil James Sharp (22 November 1859 – 23 June 1924) was an English-born collector of folk songs, folk dances and instrumental music, as well as a lecturer, teacher, composer and musician. He was the pre-eminent activist in the development of the folk-song revival in England during the Edwardian period. According to Folk Song in England, Sharp was the country’s "single most important figure in the study of folk song and music."

Sharp collected over four thousand songs from untutored rural singers, both in South-West England and the Southern Appalachian region of the United States. He published an extensive series of song books based on his fieldwork, often with piano arrangements, and wrote an influential theoretical work, English Folk Song: Some Conclusions. He also noted down surviving examples of English Morris dancing, and played an important role in the revival both of the Morris and English country dance. In 1911, he co-founded the English Folk Dance Society, which was later merged with the Folk Song Society to form the English Folk Dance and Song Society, which flourishes to this day.

Cecil Sharp’s musical legacy extends into English orchestral music, and the classroom singing experienced by generations of schoolchildren. Many of the most popular musicians of the British Folk Revival from the 1960s to the present day have used songs collected by Sharp in their work. Scores of morris dance teams throughout England, and also abroad, testify to the resilience of the revival he had a large part in sustaining. In the USA, the Country Dance and Song Society was founded with Sharp’s support, and dancers there continue to participate in styles he developed.

Over the last four decades, Sharp’s work has attracted heated debate in the field of cultural politics, with claims and counter-claims regarding selectivity, appropriation, bowdlerisation and racism.

Early life
Sharp was born in Camberwell, Surrey, the eldest son of James Sharp (a slate merchant who was interested in archaeology, architecture, old furniture and music) and his wife, Jane née Bloyd, who was also a music lover. They named him after the patron saint of music, on whose feast he was born. Sharp was educated at Uppingham, but left at 15 and was privately coached for the University of Cambridge, where he rowed in the Clare College boat and graduated B.A. in 1882.

In Australia
Sharp decided to emigrate to Australia on his father's suggestion. He arrived in Adelaide in November 1882 and early in 1883 obtained a position as a clerk in the Commercial Bank of South Australia. He read some law, and in April 1884 became associate to the Chief Justice, Sir Samuel James Way. He held this position until 1889 when he resigned and gave his whole time to music. He had become assistant organist at St Peter's Cathedral soon after he arrived, and had been conductor of the Government House Choral Society and the Cathedral Choral Society. Later he became conductor of the Adelaide Philharmonic, and in 1889 entered into partnership with I. G. Reimann as joint director of the Adelaide College of Music.

He was very successful as a lecturer but around the middle of 1891 the partnership was dissolved. The school continued under Reimann and in 1898 developed into the Elder Conservatorium of Music in connexion with the university. Sharp had made many friends and an address with over 300 signatures asked him to continue his work at Adelaide, but he decided to return to England and arrived there in January 1892. During his stay in Adelaide he composed the music for an operetta Dimple's Lovers performed by the Adelaide Garrick Club at the Albert Hall on 9 September 1890, and two light operas, Sylvia, which was produced at the Theatre Royal on 4 December 1890, and The Jonquil. The libretto in each case was written by Guy Boothby. Sharp also wrote the music for some nursery rhymes which were sung by the Cathedral Choral Society.

Return to England
In 1892 Sharp returned to England and on 22 August 1893 at East Clevedon, Somerset, he married Constance Dorothea Birch, also a music lover. They had three daughters and a son. Also in 1893 he was taken on as a music teacher by Ludgrove School, a preparatory school then in North London. During his seventeen years in the post, he took on a number of other musical jobs.

From 1896 Sharp was Principal of the Hampstead Conservatoire of Music, a half-time post which provided a house. In 1904 he met Emma Overd for the first time. She was a barely literate agricultural labourer with six children. Sharp enthused about her singing and transcribed many of her songs. In July 1905 he resigned from this post after a prolonged dispute about payment and his right to take on students for extra tuition. He had to leave the Principal's house, and apart from his position at Ludgrove his income was henceforth derived largely from lecturing and publishing on folk music.

Folk music of England

Sharp taught and composed music. Because music pedagogy of his time originated from Germany and was entirely based on tunes from German folk music, Sharp, as a music teacher, became interested in the vocal and instrumental (dance) folk music of the British Isles, especially the tunes. He felt that speakers of English (and the other languages spoken in Britain and Ireland) ought to become acquainted with the patrimony of melodic expression that had grown up in the various regions there. He began collecting folk songs in 1903 while visiting his friend (and lyrics editor) from his days in Adelaide, Charles Marson, now curate in Hambridge, South Somerset. Over 1,600 tunes or texts were collected from 350 singers, and Sharp used these songs in his lectures and press campaign to urge the rescue of English folk song. Although Sharp collected songs from 15 other counties after 1907, the Somerset songs were the core of his experience and theories.

Sharp became interested in traditional English dance when he saw a group of morris dancers with their concertina player William Kimber at the village of Headington Quarry, just outside Oxford, at Christmas 1899. At this time, morris dancing was danced in regional forms in rural areas across England; the interest generated by Sharp's notations spread the practice to urban areas, and resulted in certain Sharp-preferred morris styles to be popularised above other regional styles.

The revival of the morris dances started when Mary Neal, the organiser of the Esperance Girls' Club in London, used Sharp's (then unpublished) notations to teach the dances to the club's members in 1905. Their enthusiasm for morris dance persuaded Sharp to publish his notations in the form of his Morris Books, starting in 1907.

Dorette Wilkie was the headteacher of the Chelsea College of Physical Education which was part of the South Western Polytechnic. Starting in 1907 they set up a partnership with Sharp teaching Morris Dancing. He and Wilkie were both at the Japan–British Exhibition on 9 July 1910 in London where the college students demonstrated their dances. Sharp accompanied them on the piano and Wilkie spoke about the importance of 20 minutes exercise each day. The following month Sharp and Wilkie undertook a similar exhibition in Paris at the International Congress of School Hygiene.

Between 1911 and 1913 Sharp published a three-volume work, The Sword Dances of Northern England, which described the obscure and near-extinct Rapper sword dance of Northumbria and Long Sword dance of Yorkshire. This led to the revival of both traditions in their home areas, and later elsewhere.

Song books for teachers and pupils
At a time when state-sponsored mass public schooling was in its infancy, Sharp published song books intended for use by teachers and children in the then-being-formulated music curriculum. These song books often included arrangements of songs he had collected with piano accompaniment composed by Sharp himself, arrangements intended for choral singing. Although it has been alleged that, had they heard them, traditional singers (who in England virtually always sang unaccompanied) might well have found Sharp's piano parts distracting, the arrangements with piano accompaniment did help Sharp in his goal of disseminating the sound of English folk melodies to children in schools, thus acquainting them with their national musical heritage.

Bowdlerisation
The schools project also explains Sharp's bowdlerisation of some of the song texts, which, at least among English folk songs, often contained erotic double entendres, when not outright bawdy or violent. However, Sharp did accurately note such lyrics in his field notebooks, which, given the prudery of the Victorian era could never have been openly published (especially in a school textbook context), thus preserving them for posterity. An example of the transformation of a formerly erotic song into one suitable for all audiences is the well-known "The Keeper." The immediate goal of Sharp's project – disseminating the distinctive, and hitherto little known melodies of these songs through music education – also explains why he considered the song texts relatively less important.

English Folk Dance Society, afterwards English Folk Dance and Song Society
In 1911 Sharp co-founded the English Folk Dance Society, which promoted the traditional dances through workshops held nationwide, and which later merged with the Folk Song Society in 1932 to form the English Folk Dance and Song Society (EFDSS). The current London headquarters of the EFDSS is named Cecil Sharp House in his honor.

Influence on English classical music
Sharp's work coincided with a period of nationalism in classical music, the idea being to reinvigorate and give distinctiveness to English classical composition by grounding it in the characteristic melodic patterns and recognisable tone intervals and ornaments of its national folk music. Among the composers who took up this goal was Ralph Vaughan Williams, who carried out his own field work in folk song in Norfolk, Sussex and Surrey. The use of folk songs and dance melodies and motifs in classical music to inject vitality and excitement, is of course as old as "La Folia" and Marin Marais' "Bells of St. Genevieve" ("Sonnerie de Ste-Geneviève du Mont-de-Paris"), but the attempt to give music a sense of place was novel to the Historical particularism of late nineteenth century Romanticism.

In America
 During the years of the First World War, Sharp found it difficult to support himself through his customary work in England, and decided to try to earn his living in the United States. He was invited to act as dance consultant for a 1915 New York production of A Midsummer Night’s Dream and went on to give successful lectures and classes across the country on English folk song and especially folk dance. He met the wealthy philanthropist Helen Storrow in Boston, and with her and other colleagues was instrumental in setting up the Country Dance and Song Society. He also met Olive Dame Campbell, who brought with her a portfolio of British-origin ballads she had collected in the Southern Appalachian mountains. The quality of her collection convinced Sharp to make several song collecting expeditions into the remote mountain backcountry with his collaborator Maud Karpeles during the years 1916–1918, following in the footsteps of Olive Campbell and other collectors such as Lorraine Wyman and Katherine Jackson French.  Travelling through the Appalachian mountains in Virginia, North Carolina, Kentucky and Tennessee, often covering many miles on foot over rough terrain, Sharp and Karpeles recorded a treasure trove of folk songs, many of British origin, though in versions quite different from those Sharp had collected in rural England, and some altogether extinct in the old country. In remote log cabins Sharp would notate the tunes by ear, while Karpeles took down the words, and they collected songs from singers including Jane Hicks Gentry, Mary Sands and young members of the Ritchie family of Kentucky. Sharp was particularly interested in the tunes, which he found very beautiful and often set in ‘gapped scales’.

Sharp wrote the following words a few weeks after his arrival in Appalachia:

 The people are just English of the late eighteenth or early nineteenth century.  They speak English, look English, and their manners are old-fashioned English.  Heaps of words and expressions they use habitually in ordinary conversation are obsolete, and have been in England a long time.  I find them very easy to get on with, and have no difficulty in making them sing and show their enthusiasm for their songs.  I have taken down very nearly one hundred already, and many of these are quite unknown to me and aesthetically of the very highest value.  Indeed, it is the greatest discovery I have made since the original one I made in England sixteen years ago.

Olive Dame Campbell and her husband John had led Sharp and Karpeles to areas with a high concentration of white people of English or Scots-Irish ancestry, so the collectors had little sense of the cultural mosaic of White, Black, Indigenous and multiracial Americans that existed across Appalachia, or of the interactions between these groups that had resulted in a dynamic, hybridised folk tradition. For instance, having witnessed in white communities a form of square dancing that he christened the “Kentucky Running Set”, Sharp interpreted it inaccurately as the survival of a 17th-century English style, whereas in fact it contained significant African-American and European elements.

In their search for communities rich in British-origin songs, Sharp and Karpeles avoided German-American communities, and on one occasion turned back from a village when they realised it was an African-American settlement: "We tramped – mainly uphill. When we reached the cove we found it peopled by niggers ...  All our troubles and spent energy for nought." Sharp certainly reflected the attitudes and vocabulary of many white Americans of the time, with whom he was mixing, but unlike other mountain collectors he did take down ballads from two Black singers, one of whom he described in his field notes thus:

 Aunt Maria [Tomes] is an old coloured woman who was a slave belonging to Mrs Coleman... she sang very beautifully in a wonderfully musical way and with clear and perfect intonation... rather a nice old lady".

Sharp and Karpeles noted down a huge number of songs, many of which would otherwise have been lost, and contributed to the continuing tradition of balladry in the Appalachian Mountains. Their collection was described by ballad expert Bertrand Bronson as “without question the foremost contribution to the study of British-American folk-song”, and by Archie Green as a “monumental contribution… an unending scroll in cultural understanding”. However, it can be argued that a fascination with Child Ballads and other old British material led him and the other fieldworkers of his era to misrepresent Appalachian folk music as an overwhelmingly Anglo-Saxon or Celtic tradition, and overlook its cultural diversity.

Elizabeth DiSavino, in her 2020 biography of Katherine Jackson French, has claimed that Sharp had neglected to give proper acknowledgement to female and Scottish-diaspora sources, although in fact he mentioned both in his Introduction to English Folk Songs from the Southern Appalachians.

Political views

Sharp identified strongly with the political left of his day. He joined the Fabian Society, a Socialist organisation, in 1900, and in later years became a supporter of the Labour Party. In his younger days he was considered a radical, enjoyed an argument and, according to a colleague at Ludgrove School, liked to “pull the legs off the Tories”. While at Cambridge, Sharp heard the lectures of William Morris, which probably influenced his later self-description as a ‘conservative socialist’, since his loathing for capitalism was linked to a suspicion of the Industrial Revolution and modernity in general, and a belief in the virtues of rural over urban life. He wrote of his anger about the ‘injustice of class distinctions’, believed in collectivism over private enterprise, and in later life wrote to a colleague of his sympathy with striking coal miners. He also believed in democracy over totalitarianism, holding that “any form of collectivist government must also be democratic if it is to function properly”, and expressing scepticism about the Bolshevik revolution in Russia.

In the period before the first World War, Sharp joined the Navy League, an organisation lobbying for rearmament in the face of the threat from Germany. It has been argued that this was a ‘chauvinist’ organisation, although in fact it had supporters right across the political spectrum.

Sharp was a social reformer, an opponent of capital punishment, and a lifelong vegetarian. He was not, however, a supporter of the Suffragette movement, although this probably reflected a disapproval of their methods rather than the principle. Despite this, he maintained a friendly relationship with his sister Evelyn, an avid suffragist who was imprisoned for her activities; shortly after her release from Holloway she wrote to Sharp stating that she had no wish to quarrel over the matter, and that she did not believe he was a “confirmed ‘anti’”.

Criticism

Sharp’s ideas held sway for half a century after his death, thanks in part to an uncritical and rose-tinted biography co-authored by his disciple Maud Karpeles, who also enshrined his thinking in the 1954 definition of folk song drawn up by the International Folk Music Council. A. L. Lloyd, a Marxist and the chief theoretician of the second folk song revival during the 1960s, affected to repudiate Sharp’s ideas but in fact followed much of his thinking. He rejected Sharp’s claim that folk song could be found only in isolated rural communities as “primitive romanticism”, and described his piano arrangements as “false and unrepresentative”, but praised his ability as a collector, admired his analysis of modal tunes, and used numerous examples from his manuscripts as illustrations.

A more radical Marxist analysis was offered in the 1970s by David Harker, a Cambridge post-graduate specialising in English literature, initiated a sustained attack on the motivations and methods of the first folk revival, singling out Cecil Sharp and accusing him of having manipulated his research for ideological reasons. According to Harker:

"'[F]olk song' as mediated by Cecil Sharp, [is] to be used as 'raw material' or 'instrument', being extracted from a tiny fraction of the rural proletariat and... imposed upon town and country alike for the people's own good, not in its original form, but, suitably integrated into the Conservatoire curriculum, made the basis of nationalistic sentiments and bourgeois values."

Harker expanded this thesis in the influential book Fakesong in 1985, dismissing the very concept of folk song as "intellectual rubble which needs to be shifted so that building can begin again", and launching trenchant attacks on virtually every significant scholar in the field, from Thomas Percy and Sir Walter Scott to Francis James Child, Sabine Baring-Gould, and A. L. Lloyd. Folk song collecting, scholarship, and revival were viewed as forms of appropriation and exploitation by the bourgeoisie of the working class. An expert on printed broadsides, Harker argued against the very existence of an oral tradition, which had been so essential to Sharp’s theories, and maintained that most of what is termed "folk song" in fact originated from commercially-produced print copies. He also claimed that Sharp and Marson had bowdlerised or otherwise tampered with the songs, making "hundreds of alterations, additions and omissions" in their published material.

Fakesong led to a widespread reappraisal of the work of Sharp and his colleagues. In the 1990 Folk Music Journal, Michael Pickering concluded that the book was "the best example of this kind of work to date... Harker has provided a firm foundation for future work." Vic Gammon commented that Fakesong had taken on "the status of an orthodoxy in some quarters of the British left", and represented "the beginning of critical work" on the early folk music movement, although he stated later that, "this does not mean that Harker got it all right."

Some years later a highly critical account of Harker’s work was offered by C. J. Bearman, who carried out a detailed analysis of Harker’s statistical claims regarding biases in the way Sharp and Marson had chosen songs for publication, and noted numerous discrepancies:

"It is an interesting variety of mistake which so consistently produces errors in favour of the argument being presented. Harker's analysis is not only unsound in its methods and inaccurate in its figures and statistics, it also demonstrates a fundamental ignorance about the nature of the material being analysed.”

In the same article, Bearman disputed Harker’s analysis of editorial interventions and bowdlerisations on grounds of factual misrepresentation and exaggeration, for ignoring the difficulty of publishing erotic material in the Edwardian era, and for omitting to mention that Sharp had noted all his edits, and preserved the original texts. In another paper, he examined and found fault with Harker’s analysis of the demography of the Somerset communities in which Sharp and Marson had worked, which Harker had used to challenge Sharp’s description of the singers as belonging mostly to a rural peasantry. An article by David Gregory reached similar conclusions and praised Bearman’s "brilliant research" The theory that much of the material collected by Sharp and others had its origins in commercial print is now widely accepted, however, and the narrow definition advanced by Sharp of what constituted "folk song" has been broadened considerably.

In 1993 Georgina Boyes produced her book The Imagined Village – Culture, ideology and the English Folk Revival, which critiqued the Victorian and Edwardian folk song revival for having invented a culturally anachronistic rural community – "The Folk" - and making unrepresentative collections of songs to support the idea. The book was critical of Sharp’s assumption of a controlling role in the revival, and also of his stormy professional relationship with the socialist activist Mary Neal, who had formed a morris dance team of young, working-class women in London. Initially cordial and highly successful, their partnership soured over an ideological disagreement, Sharp’s insistence on correct traditional practice coming up against Neal’s preference for flamboyance and energy. This developed into a power struggle over control of the morris dance movement, and finally into a public feud. The Imagined Village blames Sharp for a competitive attitude and a patriarchal unwillingness to allow a forceful woman a prominent role, although Roy Judge’s detailed accounts apportion sympathy and blame more even-handedly. Daniel Walkowitz has made similar claims regarding Sharp's behaviour towards Elizabeth Burchenal during the early days of the US country dance movement.

Sharp’s song collecting in the USA has also been the subject of controversy amongst American scholars of cultural politics. Henry Shapiro held him responsible in a large part for the perception of Appalachian mountain culture as "Anglo-Saxon", while Benjamin Filene and Daniel Walkowitz claimed that Sharp had neglected to collect fiddle tunes, hymns, recent compositions, and songs of African-American origin. David Whisnant made similar claims about his selectivity, but praised him for being "serious, industrious and uniformly gracious to and respectful of local people". More recently, Phil Jamison has stated that Sharp "was interested only in English music and dances. He ignored the rest." However, Brian Peters’ detailed analysis of Sharp’s collection identified a large number of American-made songs, plus hymns, fiddle tunes, and songs which Sharp himself described as having "negro" origins.  His collection was more inclusive than those of other mountain song hunters such as Katherine Jackson French, who collected almost exclusively old British ballads, and Olive Dame Campbell. Sharp did not invent the concept of Appalachia as "Anglo-Saxon", which was well-established before he arrived, the influential and locally-born folklorist Josiah Combs stating in 1913 that "the great majority of the Kentucky highlanders are of pure, Anglo-Saxon or old English extraction," and Katherine Jackson French describing the singers she met as "sturdy Saxons".

Selected works
Cecil Sharp's Collection of English Folk Songs, Oxford University Press, 1974; .
English folk songs from the southern Appalachians, collected by Cecil J. Sharp; comprising two hundred and seventy-four songs and ballads with nine hundred and sixty-eight tunes, including thirty-nine tunes contributed by Olive Dame Campbell, edited by Maud Karpeles.  Oxford:  Oxford University Press, 1932.
English folk songs, collected and arranged with pianoforte accompaniment by Cecil J. Sharp, London:  Novello (1916).  This volume has been reprinted by Dover Publications under  and is in print.
English Folk Song:  Some Conclusions (originally published 1907. London:  Simpkin; Novello).  This work has been reprinted a number of times. For the most recent (Charles River Books), see .
The Morris Book a History of Morris Dancing, With a Description of Eleven Dances as Performed by the Morris-Men of England by Cecil J. Sharp and Herbert C MacIlwaine, London:  Novello (1907). Reprinted 2010, General Books; .

See also
Country Dance and Song Society, an American folk arts organisation spun off from chapters of Sharp's English Folk Dance Society
William Kimber
Lucy White
Jane Hicks Gentry
Mary Neal
Elizabeth Burchenal

Notes

References

External links
 Country Dance and Song Society

 
 
 
 Cecil Sharp Collection at English Folk Dance and Song Society
 
 
 
Scrapbook on Cecil Sharp's English Folk Dance Society School at UC Irvine Libraries
 Yates, Mike. "Jumping to Conclusions." "Enthusiasms" No. 36. Musical Traditions, 2003
 Yates, Mike. Cecil Sharp in America: Collecting in the Appalachians. Musical Traditions, 1999
 Gregory, David. "Fakesong in an Imagined Village? A Critique of the Harker-Boyes Thesis", 2011

1859 births
1924 deaths
Alumni of Clare College, Cambridge
British music educators
English conductors (music)
English folk-song collectors
English socialists
People educated at Uppingham School
19th-century musicologists